The River Rom, also known as the River Beam below its confluence with the Ravensbourne, is a tributary of the River Thames in England that flows through east London suburbs surrounding the metropolitan centre of Romford, part of it forming a section of the boundary between the London boroughs of Barking and Dagenham and Havering.  The Rom is culverted for a brief midsection as it passes through the centre of Romford.

Description
To the south of the town centre it regains green banks and adjoins the retail park on Rom Valley Way, passes under Roneo Corner, divides two residential estates at 8m AOD and enters Eastbrookend Country Park where it is joined by a tributary, The Ravensbourne that has flowed through Emerson Park (a second a residential area) and then a park, Harrow Lodge Park from its source in Ardleigh Green. The Rom then continues under the name of the Beam and forms the boundary between the London Borough of Havering and the London Borough of Barking and Dagenham before reaching the River Thames in the Dagenham industrial estate which included the Ford Motor Company works. The Beam Valley comprises  of land running the entire stretch of the river. The valley also includes various historical features including tank traps, pillboxes and a section of the old Romford Canal.

Etymology

Rom is a back-formation from the name of the town of Romford, which is located on a crossing of the river. The name 'Romford'  is first recorded in 1177 as Romfort, which is formed from 'rūm' and 'ford' and means "the wide or spacious ford". The name of the river is first recorded in the 13th century as le Markediche, meaning 'boundary ditch' and referring to the ancient boundary between the parishes of Dagenham and Hornchurch which later gained borough status. A more recent name for part of the river of the Beam originated from an early bridge over the river, consisting of a beam of wood.

Wildlife and environment

Throughout the northern section, where the Rom starts, in the north western part of the London Borough of Havering its valley has been designated as a Site of Importance for Nature Conservation
The river contains unbranched bur-reeds (Sparganium erectum and Sparganium emersum) and fool's watercress (Apium nodiflorum), and supports water voles, kingfishers and reed buntings.  Surrounding farmland has lapwing and Eurasian golden plover in winter.  Apart from the river environs, the Site of Importance for Nature Conservation also includes Foreberry Wood through which the river runs.  This contains both pedunculate oak and hornbeam coppices.

Also in the upper parts of the river is another Site of Importance for Nature Conservation where the river flows through King George Playing Fields in Romford.

Beam Valley
Further downstream, the Beam Valley is a mixture of woodlands, acid grassland, ponds and marsh areas, a habitat for many types of wildlife.  The London Boroughs of Barking and Dagenham and of Havering plan to develop the area to improve the conservation interest and to create new opportunities for recreation and education. The River Beam is home to the rare water vole, while the grassland in the valley includes certain rare and endangered plants.

Tributaries

The Ravensbourne
The Ravensbourne is a tributary which rises to the NNE in Ardleigh Green (part of the Hornchurch post town) and flows through two green suburbs of Romford and Hornchurch viz. Emerson Park and Harrow Lodge Park, before joining the Beam at Eastbrookend Country Park.

See also
 Tributaries of the River Thames
 List of rivers in England

Notes and references
Notes 
  
References

Rivers of London
Geography of the London Borough of Havering
Geography of the London Borough of Barking and Dagenham
Subterranean rivers of London
1Rom